A melting tank is a tank used by manufacturing companies to manufacture a variety of products.

Melting tank uses
Melting tanks can be designed to melt products such as:

 Resin
 Solder
 alloys with a low melting temperature
 Paraffin wax
 Soy
 Vegetable oil
 Palm wax
 Soap
 Gels
 Tar
 Candle wax
 Glue
 Babbitt
 Paraffin
 Synthetic adhesives
 Eutectic salts
 Oil
 Capping compound
 Plastics

Different types of tanks
The type of tank used to melt solder and tar is very different from one that is used to melt waxes, especially organic waxes such as soy, for making scented and colored candles. For example, tanks used for adhesives may need to heat up to 500degrees(°) Fahrenheit(F), while an organic soy wax will be ruined at over 140 °F and should never be heated above 200 °F. A delicate soy wax used to make candles would be burned and destroyed if not heated in an even, lower temperature than solder or tar. Also, since soaps and candles are scented and colored, the tanks designed for melting these substances need to be specially polished so there is no cross-contamination between different scents of candles or soaps. Based on this challenge, there are melting tanks that are specially coated for candle wax melting, while some have created specially coated tanks for soap making. Obviously, tar and solder makers care very little about the scent of their product, whereas fragrance is probably the most important determinant of purchasing a candle or soap.

Heating variations
Melting tanks are generally classified as either direct-heating or water-jacket-heating. There is another type of melter which uses convection heating similar to an oven. These are generally more expensive than normal heaters, even though they are inefficient and take a longer time to heat, simply because they rely on air to heat.

Direct-heat melters are generally made from aluminum and can heat up to over 500 °F. The uses vary from wax to solder. They heat with the heating element directly on the aluminum which is directly against the substance to be melted, hence the name direct melter. Since direct-heat melters apply heat directly, they generally cannot be larger than 5-10 gallons.

Water-jacket melters function more like a large, commercial double boiler in that they keep substances evenly heated but they generally only heat up to 212 °F, since that is when the water would evaporate. They can be made of aluminum, but are generally made of stainless steel. Unlike direct-heat melters, water-jacket melters can be almost unlimited in size, with 153 gallons being common and up to the larger 1000-gallon melters and more.

In the future, there is hope that one day the benefits of both direct-heat melters and water-jacket melters can somehow be combined. Currently, research is being conducted to achieve that end among some of the leading makers of melting tanks.

When selecting a melting tank, it is important that the application is known. For example, if melting large amounts of substances (or at least more than 10 or so gallons) is the goal, then water-jacket melting is the proper choice. If the substance needs to be heated to over 212 °F, then a direct-heat melter would be necessary. If heavily scented or colored substances are to be melted, then it is important that the melter be polished with a coating to prevent cross-contamination.

References 

Tools